This is a list of Hungarian-language television channels.

Hungary

Romania

State 

TVR1 partially in Hungarian
TVR Cultural partially in Hungarian
TVR 3 Cluj partially in Hungarian
TVR 3 Timişoara partially in Hungarian

Private 

JDC
Csík TV 
Digital 3 
Erdély TV
Fény TV  
Objektív Televízió 
Szuper Buli TV
Szatmar TV
TVR Târgu Mureș 50% in Hungarian 
TVS partially in Hungarian

Serbia

State
RTV2 – 50% in Hungarian

Private
Pannon RTV
Mozaik TV
TV K23 – 50% in Hungarian
City TV SU – partially in Hungarian
Yueco – partially in Hungarian

See also

 Lists of television channels
 Media of Hungary

Channels
Television
Television
Hungarian